The Raburn-Casteel House, about  north of Blairsville in Union County, Georgia is listed on the National Register of Historic Places.

Its original section, the northern end, was built c.1885 by Hodge Raburn, as a one-and-a-half-story hall-parlor-type log house.  It has a single pen addition attached to the rear of the original house, added between c.1885 and 1913.

It was added to the National Register in 2001.

References

Houses on the National Register of Historic Places in Georgia (U.S. state)
Hotel buildings completed in 1885
National Register of Historic Places in Union County, Georgia